McCurry is an unincorporated community in Gentry County, in the U.S. state of Missouri. The community is located on Missouri Route H, one half mile south of the Grand River. Darlington lies approximately two miles to the east-southeast and Carmack on U.S. Route 136 is two miles to the north.

History
McCurry was platted in 1879. The community has the name of William McCurry, an early settler. A post office called McCurry was established in 1881, and remained in operation until 1901.

References

Unincorporated communities in Gentry County, Missouri
Unincorporated communities in Missouri